Franz Aigner (24 January 1892 – 21 January 1970) was an Austrian weightlifter who competed in the 1924 Summer Olympics. He won a silver medal in the heavyweight class.

References

External links
 
 
 

1892 births
1970 deaths
Austrian male weightlifters
Olympic weightlifters of Austria
Olympic silver medalists for Austria
Olympic medalists in weightlifting
Weightlifters at the 1924 Summer Olympics
Medalists at the 1924 Summer Olympics
20th-century Austrian people